Sakunchai Saengthopho (born June 7, 1999) is a Thai professional footballer who plays as a winger for Thai League 2 club Samut Prakan City (on loan from Muangthong United).

Honours

Club
PT Prachuap
 Thai League Cup (1): 2019

International
Thailand U-23
 2019 AFF U-22 Youth Championship: Runner up

External links
 

1999 births
Living people
Sakunchai Saengthopho
Sakunchai Saengthopho
Association football wingers
Sakunchai Saengthopho
Sakunchai Saengthopho